Nobadi is a 2019 Austrian drama film directed by Karl Markovics. It was screened in the Contemporary World Cinema section at the 2019 Toronto International Film Festival.

Cast
 Heinz Trixner as Robert Senft
 Borhanulddin Hassan Zadeh as Adib Ghubar

References

External links
 

2019 films
2019 drama films
Austrian drama films
2010s German-language films